The Anglican Church of St Mary in Chilthorne Domer, Somerset, England was built in the 13th century. It is a Grade II* listed building.

History

The church was built in the 13th century, and was granted to Bruton Priory in 1301. Restoration and revision of the building took place in the 14th and 15th centuries with some Victorian restoration in the 19th.

The parish is part of the Five Crosses benefice including Tintinhull and the surrounding villages within the Diocese of Bath and Wells.

Architecture

The hamstone building has slate roofs with a small bell turret. It consists of a three-bay nave and two-bay chancel.

Inside the church the pulpit is from the 17th century, as are some of the pews. The 15th-century font is octagonal. An effigy in the sanctuary is dated to around 1275.

In the churchyard are a group of three chest tombs dating from the 17th and 18th centuries.

See also  
 List of ecclesiastical parishes in the Diocese of Bath and Wells

References

Grade II* listed buildings in South Somerset
Grade II* listed churches in Somerset
Church of England church buildings in South Somerset